The CAR 816, also called Caracal Sultan or simply Sultan, is a 5.56×45mm NATO, gas-operated, magazine-fed assault rifle that is produced by Caracal International in Abu Dhabi, United Arab Emirates. The rifle is also called Sultan in memory of the Emirati Colonel Sultan Mohammed Ali al-Kitbi who was killed in action in Saudi-led intervention in Yemen.

History
The Caracal CAR 816 shares lineage to the Heckler & Koch HK416. The principal firearms engineers for the CAR 816 were Robert Hirt and Chris Sirois. Hirt was instrumental in the development of the HK416. Following his time with Heckler & Koch, Hirt was recruited by SIG Sauer to work with then SIG engineer Chris Sirois on an improved version of the HK416: the SIG Sauer SIG516. Hirt and Sirois were then recruited by Caracal to develop a rifle that was superior to both the HK416 and SIG516. From this, the CAR 816 was created.

The CAR 816 is the primary infantry assault rifle of the United Arab Emirates Armed Forces.

Design and features 
 

The CAR 816 is a gas operated, select fire assault rifle with ambidextrous controls that fires from a closed rotary bolt.

The AR 816 is based on the AR-15 platform ergonomic architecture, but uses a short-stroke gas piston operating system (unlike the AR-15's piston-operated gas impingement system) with a user-adjustable gas system. With the help of the three position regulator (normal, adverse conditions and suppressor/silencer settings), the gas system can be adjusted to function reliably with various propellant, projectile, fouling, operating environment and configuration specific pressure behavior. The chamber is modified so the rifle is over-the-beach capable to let the CAR 816 fire safely as quickly as possible after being submerged in water. The M4 carbine profile hammer forged chrome lined barrel has a  twist rate and features a standard A2-style flash suppressor at its muzzle end.

Stock 
The CAR 816 handguard features four STANAG 2324/MIL-STD-1913 Picatinny rails. These allow for direct accessory attachment onto the rail mounting points, and can be removed without the usage of tools.

The shoulder stock is a telescoping 6 position type stock which is adjustable for length of pull.

Trigger 
The CAR 816 uses a mil-spec direct trigger.

Fire selector 
The selector settings are: safe, semi-automatic fire and automatic fire.

Sights 
The CAR 816 basic version features rail mounted flip up rear and front iron sights. The integrated rail on the upper receiver and its continuation on the handguard at the 12 o'clock position allows for the adaptation of various aiming optics.

Feeding 
The CAR 816 features a Draft STANAG 4179 compliant magazine well and is fed with STANAG magazines with a standard capacity of 30 rounds. Other STANAG compatible box and drum magazines can be used.

Variants
The weapon is available in semi-automatic and select-fire configurations with four barrel lengths;a personal defence weapon with a  barrel, a compact assault rifle with a  barrel, carbine with a  barrel and assault rifle with a  barrel.

The standard issue of the rifle supplied to the UAE armed forces bears an engraving honoring Colonel Sultan Mohammed Ali al-Kitbi.

The Caracal CAR816 A2 is a semi-automatic only export version produced in the United States by Caracal USA. It is built to exceed the NATO test protocols; “Bore Obstruction” and “Over the Beach” testing. It features some minor alterations (M-LOK rails on the handguard and a button cut and QPQ treated steel modified M4 contour barrel) to better meet civilian market preferences in the United States.

Users

Current users 
 - carbine variant used by the Republican Guard.
 - 80,000 assault rifles.

Failed bids 
 - 93,895 carbines were ordered in September 2018, but the order was cancelled in September 2020 in favour of domestically developed carbines under the Atmanirbhar Bharat initiative. Later that month Caracal offered to manufacture the weapons in India.
 - Considered by Dasan Machineries as a candidate to replace the Daewoo Precision Industries K1 used by the Republic of Korea Army Special Warfare Command. Instead, Dasan Machineries submitted the DSAR-15PC as a domestic design became a tender requirement.

See also
Caracal pistol
CAR 817 AR

References

External links

 Caracal International LLC.
 CAR 816 manufacturer specifications
 CAR816 A2 manufacturer specifications (caracalusa.com)

5.56×45mm NATO assault rifles
Short stroke piston firearms
Modular firearms
Weapons of the United Arab Emirates